Ramesh Kumar Pandey is an Indian academic, and the former vice-chancellor of Ranchi University.

Biography 
Pandey was born and brought up in Jharkhand (then Bihar). He completed his Bachelor's, Master's and Ph.D. from Ranchi University. He was a post-doctoral fellow at University of Nottingham. In his 37 years teaching career he wrote more than 25 research papers.

In 2015 he was appointed as vice-chancellor of Ranchi University. At the time of joining he told about his priority:
My priority is to organize students' union elections. It is only through students' representatives that we come to know about the problems of students. I will talk to the members of all student unions and will finalize a date for the elections as soon as possible.

References

External links 
 Profile at Ranchi University

People from Ranchi
People from Jharkhand
Ranchi University alumni
Academic staff of Ranchi University
Vice-Chancellors of the Ranchi University
Living people
Year of birth missing (living people)